This is a list of Dutch television related events from 1968.

Events
28 February - Ronnie Tober is selected to represent Netherlands at the 1968 Eurovision Song Contest with his song "Morgen". He is selected to be the thirteenth Dutch Eurovision entry during Nationaal Songfestival held at Tivoli in Utrecht.

Debuts

Television shows

1950s
NOS Journaal (1956–present)
Pipo de Clown (1958-1980)

1960s
Stiefbeen en Zoon (1964-1971)

Ending this year

Births
26 March - Martijn Krabbé, TV & radio presenter
6 July - Gordon Heuckeroth, singer & TV personality
10 November - Daphne Deckers, model, TV presenter & writer
4 December - Irene van de Laar, TV presenter & actress

Deaths